Gary DeMar is an American writer and lecturer.  A former student of Greg Bahnsen, and protégé of Gary North, he has written several books on Christian reconstructionism, as well as books targeting the homeschool movement.

Demar is also the president of American Vision, an American Christian nonprofit organization, a self-described "think tank, national training center, book publisher and speaker's bureau" at "the front lines of the culture war."

Family life and education
DeMar resides in Marietta, Georgia with his wife Carol. They have two grown sons. He is a member of Midway Presbyterian Church, affiliated with the Presbyterian Church in America. 

DeMar graduated from Western Michigan University in 1973. In 1979, he earned a Master of Divinity degree from Reformed Theological Seminary, where he had been a student of Greg Bahnsen. He earned a Ph.D. in Christian Intellectual History from Whitefield Theological Seminary in 2007.

Career
In the early years of the Christian reconstruction movement, DeMar collaborated with Gary North on several books. He has authored more than 35 books. After beginning his career at the height of reconstructionist publishing, Demar has taken the more extreme reconstructionist view and tempered it for a more broad appeal.

DeMar began working at American Vision in 1981 as a research analyst. In 1986 he became the president of the organization. DeMar stepped aside as president of American Vision in 2015, while continuing in the role of Senior Fellow. He returned to the role of president in March 2019 when Joel McDurmon resigned.

DeMar is the host of "The Gary DeMar Show," which began in 2006 as a radio program and continued as a podcast.

Views

Government 
John W. Whitehead notes DeMar's book Ruler of the Nations "presents a clear and well-substantiated description of the three types of government established by God — the family, the church, and the civil government — each given its own specific and limited jurisdiction". Gary North states that Ruler of the Nations "has made the meaning of theocracy clear;" that it is not "a civil government that is run by the institutional church," but rather "the rule of God in every area of life".  In the chapter titled Reconstructing Civil Government, DeMar writes:

All government requires a reference point. If God is to be pleased by men, the Bible must become the foundation of all their governments, including civil government. This means that Biblical law must be made the foundation of all righteous judgment in every government: personal (self government), ecclesiastical, familial, and civil.

DeMar states in an article on the American Vision web site, "Darwinism has secularized everything in America, including our understanding of the Constitution".

Eschatology 
DeMar is a proponent of partial preterism, interpreting the Olivet Discourse as specific to the generation to whom Jesus was speaking in Matthew 24.

Criticism 
The Southern Poverty Law Center describes DeMar as "an outspoken anti-gay activist who regularly hosts and speaks at Christian-right events," and American Vision as an extremist group and an organization advocating "a complete theocracy governed by Old Testament law."

Selected works

References

Dominion theology
American evangelists
Living people
Christian reconstructionism
American anti-same-sex-marriage activists
Year of birth missing (living people)
Western Michigan University alumni
People from Marietta, Georgia
Conservatism in the United States